The men's 400 metre freestyle competition of the swimming events at the 1955 Pan American Games took place on 23 March. The last Pan American Games champion was Tetsuo Okamoto of Brazil.

This race consisted of eight lengths of the pool, with all eight being in the freestyle stroke.

Results
All times are in minutes and seconds.

Heats

Final 
The final was held on March 23.

References

Swimming at the 1955 Pan American Games